The Men's lightweight single sculls event at the 2010 South American Games was held over March 21 at 9:20.

Medalists

Records

Results

References
Final

Lightweight Single Scull M